Douglas Gray (22 March 1936 – 6 September 2004) was a New Zealand cricketer. He played in sixteen first-class matches for Northern Districts from 1956 to 1960.

See also
 List of Northern Districts representative cricketers

References

External links
 

1936 births
2004 deaths
New Zealand cricketers
Northern Districts cricketers
Cricketers from Auckland
North Island cricketers